Dorien Berendina Lubertha de Vries (born 7 December 1965, in Enschede) is a sailor from the Netherlands, who represented her country at the 1992 Summer Olympics in Barcelona. De Vries took the Bronze medal on the Women's Lechner A-390. De Vries returned to the 1996 Olympics in Savannah, Georgia where she took 10th place on the Women's Mistral One Design.

Further reading

1992 Olympics (Barcelona)

1996 Olympics (Savannah)

References

External links
 
 
 

1965 births
Living people
Dutch female sailors (sport)
Dutch windsurfers
Female windsurfers
Olympic bronze medalists for the Netherlands
Olympic medalists in sailing
Olympic sailors of the Netherlands
Sailors at the 1992 Summer Olympics – Lechner A-390
Sailors at the 1996 Summer Olympics – Mistral One Design
Medalists at the 1992 Summer Olympics
Sportspeople from Enschede